Yan Han (born March 6, 1996) is a Chinese competitive figure skater. He is a three-time Four Continents bronze medalist (2013, 2015, 2016), the 2013 Cup of China champion and a four-time Chinese national champion (2010-2011, 2018, 2020). 

On the junior level, he is the 2012 Youth Olympic champion, the 2012 Junior World champion, the winner of four ISU Junior Grand Prix titles, and a two-time Junior Grand Prix Final silver medalist (2010, 2011).

Career 

The only athlete in his family, Yan started skating at the age of 5. He trained in Harbin until he relocated to Beijing in early 2012.

2009–2010 season: Junior Grand Prix debut 
Yan made his ISU Junior Grand Prix debut in the 2009–2010 season. He won gold at the event in Turkey, his only assignment that season. He did not compete at the 2010 World Junior Championships due to a fracture injury.

2010–2011 season 
Yan was assigned to the 2010–11 ISU Junior Grand Prix events in Austria and Czech Republic. After winning his two JGP events, he qualified to the Junior Grand Prix Final, which was held in Beijing, China. Yan took the silver medal in his home country. He ended the season by placing 6th in his debut at the 2011 World Junior Championships in Korea.

2011–2012 season: Youth Olympic and World Junior titles 
In the 2011–2012 season, Yan began attempting a triple Axel and a quad toe loop in competition. After winning gold at his JGP events in Austria and Italy, Yan qualified for the 2011–12 Junior Grand Prix Final. At the event, held in Quebec City, Canada, he won the silver medal despite having a fever. He became the 2012 Youth Olympics champion in Innsbruck, Austria.

At the 2012 World Junior Championships, Yan became the first skater representing China to win the men's junior world title.

2012–2013 season: First medal at Four Continents 
Yan started his season at the 2012 JGP Slovenia, where he finished fifth after a shattering fall on the quadruple toe loop in the free program. He then won silver, behind Maxim Kovtun at the 2012 JGP Croatia. He did not advance to the JGP Final.

Yan took silver at the 2013 Chinese Championships. He made his senior international debut at the 2013 Four Continents Championships, where he took the bronze medal. Yan ended the season placing ninth in the men's discipline and fifth with Team China at the 2013 World Team Trophy. He then flew to Toronto to work with Lori Nichol for two new programs for the upcoming season.

2013–2014 season: Grand Prix debut 

Yan's senior Grand Prix debut came at the 2013 Cup of China. He placed first in the short setting a personal best score of 90.14 points and placed second in the free winning the gold medal overall, ahead of Maxim Kovtun. Yan set a personal best overall score of 245.62 points. Yan finished fourth at the 2013 Trophée Éric Bompard, competing with a fever that he developed the day before his short program. His results qualified him for the Grand Prix Final, in which he placed sixth overall. He was selected to compete at the 2014 Winter Olympics in Sochi, where he finished seventh. He then finished seventh at the 2014 World Figure Skating Championships in Saitama, Japan.

2014–2015 season: Second bronze at Four Continents 
Yan's first assignment of the 2014 Grand Prix season was Cup of China. On November 8, during the free skate warm-up, he collided with Japan's Yuzuru Hanyu. Yan was visibly injured, but decided to compete. He placed seventh in the free program and sixth overall. Later in the same month, he placed eighth at another Grand Prix event, the 2014 Trophee Eric Bompard.

At the 2015 Four Continents Championships, Yan took the bronze medal with a combined score of 259.47, a personal best. He placed tenth at the 2015 World Championships.

2015–2016 season: Third bronze at Four Continents
Competing in the 2015 Grand Prix season, Yan placed fourth at Skate America and took bronze at Cup of China. He went on to win his third bronze medal at the 2016 Four Continents Championships, setting personal bests in the free program (181.98) and combined score (271.55). Yan placed twenty-sixth at the 2016 World Championships.

2016–2017 season
During the 2016 Grand Prix season, Yan placed tenth at Skate Canada and fifth at Cup of China. He ranked 10th at the 2017 Four Continents Championships. He won a bronze medal at the 2017 Asian Winter Games.

Yan's shoulder dislocated repeatedly after he sustained a fracture. As a result, he withdrew from the 2017 World Championships.

2017–2018 season 
Yan's first international competition during this season was the International Cup of Nice, where he won the gold medal. For his Grand Prix assignments, Yan competed at Skate America and the Cup of China, placing fifth at both competitions. He then became the Chinese national champion and went on to place tenth at the 2018 Four Continents Figure Skating Championships. During this season, he competed in the 2018 Winter Olympics, making it his second time at the Olympics. He ranked 23rd overall.

2018–2019 season
Yan did not compete internationally during the season, subsequently attributing this to both injury recovery and disappointment with his performances in recent seasons.  Initially intending to travel and study, he ultimately opted to plan a return to competition.

2019–2020 season
Yan won his fourth national title at the 2020 Chinese Championships in September. Despite rumors of his retirement, he was initially assigned to 2019 CS Nebelhorn Trophy, but withdrew before the event. Yan was assigned to the 2019 Cup of China, where, despite performing only triple jumps, he placed first in the short program, narrowly ahead of Jin Boyang.  After placing second in the free skate behind Jin, he won the silver medal. Speaking afterward, he thanked the Chinese Skating Association for giving him the chance to return to competition, and said that he was somewhat surprised to be competitive for a medal without quads. Yan did not receive a second Grand Prix assignment, and thus could not contend for a 2019–20 Grand Prix Final berth.

Making his return to the Four Continents Championships in February 2020, Yan placed tenth. Yan was required to self-quarantine for two weeks after returning to China, due to the COVID-19 pandemic. As a result, he was not named to the team for the 2020 World Championships, despite China having two men's spots.

2020–2021 season 
With the 2020–21 figure skating season having to deal with the COVID-19 pandemic, senior skaters were invited to a maximum of one Grand Prix event, based largely on geographic location. Yan was invited to the 2020 Cup of China, where he won the silver medal for the second consecutive year.

Yan competed at the 2021 World Championships in Stockholm, placing thirteenth, while Jin Boyang placed twenty-second. As a result, China qualified only one men's berth at the 2022 Winter Olympics in Beijing.

2021–2022 season 
For the 2021-22 Grand Prix Season, Yan was assigned to the 2021 Cup of China, which was later cancelled and replaced by the 2021 Gran Premio d'Italia. Yan's name was initially in this entry list as well, but he later withdrew.

Age controversy 
In February 2011, a group of Chinese skaters' ages became the subject of controversy as their birth dates published on the Chinese Skating Association's website did not match the ones listed on their bio pages in the ISU website. The controversy prompted a search for more discrepancies among Chinese figure skaters' dates of births. According to news articles published in February 2011, although Yan's birthday was listed as March 6, 1996 on ISU's website, the Chinese website suggested that he was born on that day in 1994. Officials from the State General Administration of Sports held a press conference where they attributed the discrepancies to erroneous information provided by the Chinese website.

Programs

Competitive highlights
GP: Grand Prix; CS: Challenger Series; JGP: Junior Grand Prix

Detailed results
Small medals for short program and free skating awarded only at ISU Championships. Personal bests highlighted in bold.

2013–14 to present

2009–10 to 2012–13

References

External links 

 

 

1996 births
Living people
Figure skaters from Harbin
Chinese male single skaters
World Junior Figure Skating Championships medalists
Figure skaters at the 2014 Winter Olympics
Figure skaters at the 2018 Winter Olympics
Olympic figure skaters of China
Figure skaters at the 2012 Winter Youth Olympics
Youth Olympic gold medalists for China
Figure skaters at the 2017 Asian Winter Games
Medalists at the 2017 Asian Winter Games
Asian Games bronze medalists for China
Asian Games medalists in figure skating
Four Continents Figure Skating Championships medalists